Luis Joaquín Quintana Santos (December 25, 1951 – July 27, 2009) was a professional baseball player who played two seasons for the California Angels of Major League Baseball. Quintana was born in Vega Baja, Puerto Rico.

On July 27, 2009, Quintana was found dead in his car after a crash in West Palm Beach, Florida. Officials from the Palm Beach County sheriff's office indicated that Quintana had died of natural causes while driving. Quintana's family announced their intention to take his remains back to Vega Baja, Puerto Rico for burial.

References

External links

1951 births
2009 deaths
Anderson Giants players
California Angels players
Charlotte O's players
Decatur Commodores players
Denver Bears players
El Paso Diablos players
Fresno Giants players
Major League Baseball pitchers
Major League Baseball players from Puerto Rico
People from Vega Baja, Puerto Rico
Salt Lake City Gulls players
Syracuse Chiefs players
Wichita Aeros players